Pratensein is an O-methylated isoflavone, a type of flavonoid. It can be found in Trifolium pratense (red clover) and can have effects for the prevention of atherosclerosis.

References 

O-methylated isoflavones
Resorcinols